Muntari is a surname. Notable people with the surname include:

 Mohammed Muntari (born 1993), Ghanaian-born Qatari footballer
 Sulley Muntari (born 1984), Ghanaian professional footballer

See also
 Mundari (disambiguation)

Surnames of African origin